The Badminton at the 1985 Southeast Asian Games was held at the Indoor Stadium in Chulalongkorn University, Bangkok, Thailand. the Badminton was held between December 9 to December 15.

Medals by event

Semifinal results

Final results

Men's team

Semifinals

Gold medal match

References

BASOC (1985) 13th SEA Games Official Report, Thailand

Badminton
Southeast Asian Games
Multi-sport events, Southeast Asian Games
Multi-sport events, Southeast Asian Games